Faithful is the third studio album from American contemporary R&B group Hi-Five, released October 26, 1993 via Jive Records. The album peaked at #105 on the Billboard 200 and at #23 on the Billboard R&B chart.

Four singles were released from the album: "Unconditional Love", "Never Should've Let You Go", "Faithful" and "What Can I Say to You (To Justify My Love)". "Never Should've Let You Go" was the most successful single from the album, peaking at #30 on the Billboard Hot 100 in 1994.

Faithful is the final album that was released by Jive and is the only album to feature two newcomers Shannon Gill and Terrence Murphy.

Track listing

Samples

Chart positions

References

External links
 
 

1993 albums
Hi-Five albums
Jive Records albums